Events from the year 1920 in Romania. The year was marked by the signing of the Treaty of Trianon and Treaty of Paris, and a general strike.

Incumbents
 King: Ferdinand.
 Prime Minister:
 Alexandru Vaida-Voevod (until 13 March).
 Alexandru Averescu (from 13 March).

Events
 25 May – In a general election, the ruling People's Party is victorious.
 4 June – The Treaty of Trianon is signed. Transylvania and most of Banat become part of Romania.
 20 October – Over 400,000 workers engage in a general strike that lasts until 28 October.
 28 October – The Treaty of Paris is signed, affirming the Union of Bessarabia with Romania.

Births
 25 April – Sofia Ionescu, neurosurgeon (died 2008).
 3 July – Paul-Mihu Sadoveanu, novelist and soldier (killed in action at the Battle of Turda in 1944).
 16 August – Virgil Ierunca, literary critic, journalist, and poet (died 2006).
 20 August – Zoe Dumitrescu-Bușulenga, comparatist and essayist (died 2006).
 5 November – Kató Havas, violinist (died  2018).

Deaths
 27 February – Alexandru Dimitrie Xenopol, historian and philosopher (born 1847).
 9 March –  Haralamb Lecca, poet, playwright and translator (born 1873).
 24 November – Alexandru Macedonski, poet, novelist, dramatist, and literary critic (born 1854).

References

Years of the 20th century in Romania
1920s in Romania
 
Romania
Romania